Plinio Nomellini (1866–1943) was an Italian painter.

Biography
Nomellini was born in Livorno in 1866. In 1885 he enrolled at the Florence Academy of Fine Arts, where he studied under Giovanni Fattori and formed friendships with Telemaco Signorini and Silvestro Lega as well as Giuseppe Pellizza some time later.

At the 1886 Promotrice of Florence, he exhibited a portrait and a landscape of Un uliveto; at the 1887 Mostra he exhibited L'incontro and Piano di Tombolo. In 1888, he exhibited a Portrait of Nina Van Zandt and Il fieno. At the Mostra held at the Società d'Incoraggiamento of Florence he displayed the following paintings: Al sole; Sciopero; La giornata è finita (The Journey is Finished); Fiore selvaggio; Foce del Calambrone, and The Summer of San Martino.

He took part in the Paris Universal Exhibition of 1889 and moved to Genoa, where he adopted Divisionism, the following year. He exhibited a piece inspired by the Genoese workers' strikes at the 1st Brera Triennale in 1891 and was arrested on charges of anarchism in 1894. After being tried and acquitted, he became the focal point of a lively artistic set known as the Gruppo d’Albano. The guest of his friend Giacomo Puccini at Torre del Lago from 1902, he took up Symbolism and was involved in the creation of the "Dream Room" at the 7th Venice Biennale in 1907, having taken part in this event uninterruptedly since 1899 as well as the exhibitions of Genoa, Turin, Milan, Florence and Rome.  In 1909 participated in the Paris Salon d'Automme with his fellow Tuscans, Llewelyn Lloyd and Benvenuto Benvenuti.

He moved to Florence in 1919 and also set up a studio on the island of Elba, where he focused on landscape painting, in the following decade. He died in Florence in 1943.

References

 Laura Casone, Plinio Nomellini, online catalogue Artgate by Fondazione Cariplo, 2010, CC BY-SA (source for the first revision of this article).

Other projects

1866 births
1943 deaths
People from Livorno
19th-century Italian painters
Italian male painters
20th-century Italian painters
Divisionist painters
Accademia di Belle Arti di Firenze alumni
19th-century Italian male artists
20th-century Italian male artists